Marinovic Beach is a gently sloping beach on the south shore of Explorers Cove, New Harbour, on the Scott Coast of Victoria Land, Antarctica. It was named by the Advisory Committee on Antarctic Names after Baldo Marinovic, a graduate student of biology at the University of California, Santa Cruz, and a member of the 1985 winter party at McMurdo Station. During 1984–85, the sea off this beach was a site for the study of the reproductive biology and larval ecology of shallow-water echinoderms by biologists from the university. The name came into local use following the selection of the beach by Marinovic, correctly, as a likely place to study echinoderms.

References

Beaches of Antarctica
Landforms of Victoria Land
Scott Coast